Thienobenzodiazepine is a heterocyclic compound containing a diazepine ring fused to a thiophene ring and a benzene ring. Thienobenzodiazepine forms the central core of pharmaceutical drugs including atypical antipsychotic olanzapine (Zyprexa) and antimuscarinic telenzepine. Thienobenzodiazepines act relatively selectively at the α2 subunit of the GABAA receptor.

Thienobenzodiazepines